Starting Over may refer to:

In music:
 Starting Over (Chris Stapleton album)
 "Starting Over" (Chris Stapleton song), the title track
 Starting Over (Raspberries album), and a song from that album
 Starting Over (Reba McEntire album)
 Starting Over (Speed album), and a song from that album
 Starting Over (Edison Glass EP)
 Starting Over (La Toya Jackson EP), 2011
 "Starting Over" (Tammy Wynette song), a 1980 song released as a single by Tammy Wynette
 "(Just Like) Starting Over", a song by John Lennon
 "Starting Over", a song from The Crystal Method's Legion of Boom
 "Starting Over", a song from Jennifer Lopez's album Love?
 "Starting Over" (Killswitch Engage song)
 "Starting Over", a song from Audio Adrenaline's Until My Heart Caves In
 "Starting Over", a song from Korn's untitled album
 "Starting Over", a song from Robbie Seay Band's Give Yourself Away
 "Starting Over", a song from Saliva's Blood Stained Love Story
 "Starting Over", a song from Slave's Stone Jam
 "Starting Over", a song from Strawbs' Heartbreak Hill

In film and television:
 Starting Over (1979 film), 1979 film starring Burt Reynolds
 Starting Over (2007 film), 2007 film set in Scotland
 Starting Over (TV series)
 "Starting Over," an episode of the TV series Falcon Beach

In literature:
 Starting Over (autobiography), a 2011 autobiography by La Toya Jackson

See also
Starting Over Again (disambiguation)